Black Fox of Lorne is a 1956 children's historical novel written and illustrated by Marguerite de Angeli. This Newbery Honor Book is about tenth-century Viking twins who shipwreck on the Scottish coast and seek to avenge the death of their father. They encounter loyal clansmen at war, kindly shepherds, power-hungry lairds, and staunch crofters.

Author Marguerite de Angeli had earlier won the Newbery Medal for excellence in American children's literature for her 1949 novel The Door in the Wall.

References 

1956 American novels
Children's historical novels
Newbery Honor-winning works
Novels set in the 10th century
American children's novels
Doubleday (publisher) books
1956 children's books